Jordi Gallardo (born 23 March 1976 in Andorra La Vella) is the Minister of Economy in Andorra since 2019.

References

Living people
1976 births
Government ministers of Andorra
University of Lleida alumni
Liberal Party of Andorra politicians
21st-century Andorran politicians
People from Andorra la Vella
University of Navarra alumni